The 1964 season was the 59th season of competitive football in Norway.

1. divisjon

2. divisjon

Group A

Group B

3. divisjon

Group Østland/Søndre

GroupØstland/Nordre

Group Sørland/Vestland, A

Group Sørland/Vestland, B

Group Sørland/Vestland, C

Group Møre

Group Trøndelag

District IX

District X

District XI

Play-off Sørland/Vestland
October 4: Os - Bryne 1-2

October 11: Donn - Os 2-2

October 18: Bryne - Donn 1-1

Play-off Møre/Trøndelag
October 11: Verdal - Hødd 0-2

October 18: Hødd - Verdal 4-2 (agg. 6-2)

Hødd promoted

4. divisjon

District I

District II, Group A

District II, Group B

District III, Group A (Oplandene)

District III, Group B1 (Sør-Østerdal)

District III, Group B2 (Nord-Østerdal)

District III, Group B3 (Sør-Gudbrandsdal)

District III, Group B4 (Nord-Gudbrandsdal)

District IV, Group A (Vestfold)

District IV, Group B (Grenland)

District IV, Group B (Øvre Telemark)

District V, Group A1 (Aust-Agder)

District V, Group A2 (Vest-Agder)

District V, Group B1 (Rogaland)

District V, Group B2 (Rogaland)

District V, Group C (Sunnhordland)

District VI, Group A (Bergen)

District VI, Group B (Midthordland)

District VI, Group C (Sogn og Fjordane)

District VII, Group A (Sunnmøre)

District VII, Group B (Romsdal)

District VII, Group C (Nordmøre)

District VIII, Group A (Sør-Trøndelag)

District VIII, Group B (Trondheim og omegn)

District VIII, Group C (Fosen)

District VIII, Group D (Nord-Trøndelag/Namdal)

District IX

District X

District XI

Play-off District I/IV
Selbak - Tønsbergkameratene 5-1
Ulefoss - Pors 2-4
Pors - Selbak 4-0
Tønsbergkameratene - Ulefoss 2-0
Tønsbergkameratene - Pors 2-2
Selbak - Ulefoss 9-1

Play-off District II
Liv - Drafn 0-2
Drafn - Liv 3-1 (agg. 5-1)

Drafn promoted

Play-off District III
Brekken - Nordre Trysil 1-0
Faaberg - Dovre 2-1
Faaberg - Brekken 2-4
Brekken - Hamar IL 1-7
Hamar IL - Brekken 3-1

Hamar IL promoted

Play-off District V
Buøy - Ålgård 2-0
Ålgård - Buøy 1-1 (agg. 1-3)

Buøy promoted

Ålgård - Odda 1-2 (in Haugesund)

Odda promoted

Championship District V
Våg - Sørfjell 3-1
Sørfjell - Våg (not played)

Play-off District VI
Sogndal - Baune 1-0
Baune - Fana 6-0
Fana - Sogndal 0-1

Play-off District VII
Clausenengen - Nord-Gossen 1-2
Nord-Gossen - Rollon 2-1
Rollon - Clausenengen 1-1

Clausenengen - Rollon 4-3 (in Molde)

Clausenengen promoted

Play-off District VIII
Fram - Sandviken 3-3
Flå - Heimdal 5-1
Hasselvika - Flå 1-2
Heimdal - Fram 2-2
Hasselvika - Heimdal 3-0
Fram - Flå 0-1

Norwegian Cup

Final

Northern Norwegian Cup

Final

European Cups

Norwegian representatives
Lyn (Champions Cup
Skeid (Cup Winners Cup)
Vålerengen (Fairs Cup)

Champions Cup

First round
September 9: Reipas Lahti (Finland) - Lyn 2-1

October 7: Lyn - Reipas Lahti 3-0 (agg. 4-2)

Second round
November 4: DWS Amsterdam (Netherlands) - Lyn 5-0

November 18: Lyn - DWS Amsterdam 1-3 (agg. 1-8)

Cup Winners' Cup

First round
September 15: Skeid - Haka Valkeakoski (Finland) 1-0

October 7: Haka Valkeakoski - Skeid 2-0 (agg. 2-1)

Fairs Cup

First round
September 23: Vålerengen - Everton (England) 2-5

October 14: Everton - Vålerengen 4-2 (agg. 9-4)

National team

Note: Norway's goals first 
Explanation:
WCQ = World Cup Qualifier

     
Seasons in Norwegian football